Eduard Brok (also Eduard Brock; born 1880 Petserimaa) was an Estonian politician. He was a member of II Riigikogu. He was a member of the Riigikogu since 4 June 1924. He replaced Jaan Vaher.

References

1880 births
Year of death missing
People from Pskovsky Uyezd
Workers' United Front politicians
Estonian Socialist Workers' Party politicians
Members of the Riigikogu, 1923–1926